Steel dragon or Steel Dragon can refer to:
 Steel Dragon, a fictitious heavy metal rock band central to the plot of the 2001 film Rock Star featuring Mark Wahlberg and Jennifer Aniston
 Steel dragon, the fictional race of dragons in the Dungeons & Dragons Greyhawk campaign setting (also known as Greyhawk dragons)
 Steel Dragon 2000, a roller coaster at Nagashima SpaLand Amusement Park in Nagashima, Japan
 Superior Defender Gundam Force, Steel Dragon was the name of a fictional dragon in this animated television show
 82nd Field Artillery Regiment (United States), a regiment of the U.S. Army was stationed in Camp Steel Dragon in Iraq in 2004
A monster in the MMORPG RuneScape
Steel Dragon EX, a video game that includes Shienryu and Shienryu Explosion